Kappa Nu was an American college fraternity that was active from 1911 to 1961 when it merged with Phi Epsilon Pi.

History
Kappa Nu was founded at the University of Rochester on November 12, 1911. The founders were: 
 Joseph Bernhardt
 Abraham Levy
 Joseph Lazarus
 Harold Leve
 Morris Lazersohn
 Louis Gottlieb

All six were pre-medical or medical students. In 1917, five loosely connected groups (U of Rochester and others created by men who had left Rochester) held a convention in Rochester and set up Kappa Nu as a National Fraternity. By the 1918 Convention, Kappa Nu had 10 chapters. It continued to add chapters thru 1931.

On October 14, 1961, Kappa Nu's 13 existing active chapters voted to merge with Phi Epsilon Pi fraternity. Of these, at three campuses where Phi Epsilon Pi already existed, those chapters declined to participate in the merger.

In 1970, Zeta Beta Tau absorbed Phi Epsilon Pi.

Symbols and ritual
The colors were purple and white.

Publications
As of 1920, the fraternity had a semi-annual publication called Kappa Nu. the Baird's Archive notes this was called The Reporter, published three times per year.

Notable alumni
Mel Allen - Primary play-by-play announcer for New York Yankees

Chapter list
There were 27 chapters established. The chapters of Kappa Nu were:
Alpha - University of Rochester --
Beta (also Rho Sigma Alpha) - New York University --
Gamma (also Rho Sigma Beta) - Columbia University --
Delta (also Upsilon Rho Alpha) -Union College --
Epsilon (also Beta Upsilon Rho) - Boston University --
Zeta (also Beta Rho) - University at Buffalo --
Eta - Harvard University --
Theta - University at Albany --
Iota (also Upsilon Rho Beta)- Union College --
Kappa - Rensselaer Polytechnic Institute --
Lambda - Western Reserve University --
Mu - University of Michigan --
Nu - University of Pennsylvania --
Xi - University of Pittsburgh --
Omicron - University of Chicago --, -
Pi - University of Alabama --
Rho - University of Cincinnati --
Sigma - Tulane University --
Tau - University of California, Berkeley --
Upsilon - University of Arkansas --
Phi - Alfred University --
Psi - University of Tennessee --
Chi - Louisiana State University --
Omega - New York University (Washington Sq) --19xx
Alpha Beta - Cornell University -
Alpha Delta - University of California, Los Angeles --
Alpha Omega - Wayne State University --
Alpha Epsilon - ?
Alpha Zeta - City University of New York -195x-

See also
 List of Jewish fraternities and sororities

References

Defunct former members of the North American Interfraternity Conference
Zeta Beta Tau
Student organizations established in 1911
Historically Jewish fraternities in the United States
1911 establishments in New York (state)
Jewish organizations established in 1911